Blas Ariel Coronel (born 10 December 1987) is a Paraguayan professional footballer who plays as a defender for Deportivo Capiatá.

Career
Rubio Ñu were Coronel's first senior club, the defender appeared twenty-five times between 2008 and 2010. Coronel had a stint with Independiente in 2011 before rejoining Rubio Ñu later that year, with his opening senior goal arriving on 10 September 2011 against Nacional. Paraguayan División Intermedia side Fernando de la Mora signed Coronel in 2012, months prior to Sportivo Luqueño of the Paraguayan Primera División doing the same. He remained for the 2012 and 2013 campaigns before resigning with Rubio Ñu in 2014. Coronel subsequently played for Deportivo Caaguazú and Resistencia in 2018.

Following two goals in twenty-two games for Resistencia in División Intermedia, Coronel moved up to the top-flight in 2019 with Deportivo Capiatá. He made a total of eight appearances, which included a debut over ex-club Sportivo Luqueño, as they suffered relegation.

Career statistics
.

References

External links

1987 births
Living people
Sportspeople from Asunción
Paraguayan footballers
Association football defenders
Paraguayan Primera División players
Paraguayan División Intermedia players
Club Rubio Ñu footballers
Independiente F.B.C. footballers
Fernando de la Mora footballers
Sportivo Luqueño players
Resistencia S.C. footballers
Deportivo Capiatá players